Sir Joseph George Long Innes (16 October 1834 – 28 October 1896), was a judge and politician in colonial Australia, and Attorney General of New South Wales from 1873 to 1875.

Innes was born in Sydney, New South Wales the eldest son of Major Joseph Long Innes (superintendent of police) and his wife Elizabeth Anne, the daughter of Thomas Reibey and Mary Reibey. Innes was educated at William Timothy Cape's school and at the King's School, Parramatta. He then went to England, and entered as a student at Lincoln's Inn in November 1856; and, after winning a certificate of honour in May 1859, he was called to the bar in November of the same year.

Having returned to Australia, Innes was admitted to the New South Wales bar in 1862, and practised till 1865, when he was appointed a district judge in Queensland. This position he resigned in 1869, and returned to practise his profession in Sydney. He also went into politics, and was returned to the New South Wales Legislative Assembly for Mudgee on 7 March 1872, in May of which year he became Solicitor General in the first Parkes ministry. He resigned as the member for Mudgee to accept an appointment to the Legislative Council, appointed Representative of the Government in the Legislative Council from taking his seat on 9 September 1873. In November he was appointed Attorney General in succession to Edward Butler, without a seat in Cabinet, holding office until the break-up of the Parkes Ministry in February 1875. In the previous year he had accompanied Sir Hercules Robinson, the then Governor of New South Wales, on his special mission to Fiji, in connection with the annexation of the island to the British Crown, and was knighted in January 1875 in recognition of his legal services on that occasion. Sir George acted as Chairman of Committees in the Legislative Council till August 1880, when he succeeded Francis Suttor as Minister of Justice in the third Parkes ministry, resigning from the ministry and the Legislative Council in October 1881, on being appointed a Judge of the Supreme Court of New South Wales.

In 1865 Innes married Emily Janet  Smith, daughter of John Smith of Llanarth, Bathurst, New South Wales.

One of his sons, Reginald, was also appointed to the Supreme Court.

References

 

1834 births
1896 deaths
Members of the New South Wales Legislative Assembly
Members of the New South Wales Legislative Council
19th-century Australian politicians
Attorneys General of the Colony of New South Wales
Solicitors General for New South Wales
Judges of the Supreme Court of New South Wales
Colony of New South Wales judges
19th-century Australian judges
Chairman of Committees of the New South Wales Legislative Council